"All Right Now" is a song by English rock band Free. It is featured on the band's third studio album, Fire and Water (1970), and was released by Island Records, a record label founded by Chris Blackwell. Released as the album's second single, "All Right Now" peaked at number 2 on the UK Singles Chart and number 4 on the US Billboard Hot 100 singles chart. In July 1973, the song was re-released, peaking number 15 on the UK chart. In 1991, a Bob Clearmountain remix of the song was released, reaching number 8 on the UK chart.

"All Right Now" was a number 1 hit in over 20 countries and was recognised by American Society of Composers, Authors, and Publishers in 1990 for garnering over 1,000,000 radio plays in the U.S. by late 1989. In 2006, the BMI London awards included a Million Air award for 3 million air plays of "All Right Now" in the USA. The song remains as a staple of classic rock radio.

Composition
According to drummer Simon Kirke, "All Right Now" was written by Free bassist Andy Fraser and singer Paul Rodgers in the Durham Students' Union building, Dunelm House.
He said: "'All Right Now' was created after a bad gig in Durham. We finished our show and walked off the stage to the sound of our own footsteps. The applause had died before I had even left the drum riser. It was obvious that we needed a rocker to close our shows. All of a sudden the inspiration struck Fraser and he started bopping around singing 'All Right Now'. He sat down and wrote it right there in the dressing room. It couldn’t have taken more than ten minutes." Fraser has agreed largely with this history.

Chart history

Weekly charts

Year-end charts

Certifications

Personnel

Free 
 Paul Rodgers – vocals
 Paul Kossoff – guitar
 Andy Fraser – bass, piano
 Simon Kirke – drums

Cover versions

"All Right Now", recorded by Mike Oldfield (produced by Tom Newman), with vocals by Wendy Roberts, Pierre Moerlen and Tom Newman, was issued as a one-sided promotional blue 7" single flexi-disc in 1979. The single was given only to Virgin Records executives and never issued to the public, making it one of the most elusive collectors' items in the Oldfield catalogue (number Virgin TT-362).

Also in 1979, studio disco group Witch Queen released a disco version of the song, as a double A-side with a cover of T. Rex's "Bang a Gong". It peaked at number eight on the US Billboard disco chart.

Since 1972, "All Right Now" as arranged by the Stanford Band has been the de facto fight song of Stanford University athletic teams.

Rod Stewart recorded the song and released it as a single in the U.S., reaching number 72 in the winter of 1985. Billboard said that it "adds some subtler rhythm patterns" to the original version, while demonstrating how much the original version sounded like a Rod Stewart song.

Pop duo Pepsi & Shirlie recorded it for their 1987 debut album, also called All Right Now. It reached number 50 in the UK singles chart in December 1987. 

Portuguese rock band GNR covered the song for their 1992 album Rock In Rio Douro, with original portuguese lyrics, as "Homem Mau".

See also
 Return of the Champions
 Super Live in Japan
 List of 1970s one-hit wonders in the United States
 Free discography

References

External links
 Lyrics of live cover by Queen + Paul Rodgers from Live in Ukraine, from Queen official website
 

1970 singles
Stanford University
Pac-12 Conference fight songs
Rod Stewart songs
Free (band) songs
Songs written by Paul Rodgers
Songs written by Andy Fraser
1970 songs
Island Records singles
A&M Records singles
Number-one singles in Sweden
Number-one singles in Denmark